Candace Costie (born March 12, 1963) is an American competitor and Olympic champion in synchronized swimming.

After claiming a silver medal in the women's duet at the 1982 World Aquatics Championships with her swimming partner Tracie Ruiz, they went on to secure gold medals in both the women's duet at the 1983 Pan American Games and the women's duet at the 1984 Summer Olympics. Their partnership also extended to winning four US national championships and one NCAA national championship.

In 1985, Costie married Olympic silver medalist Doug Burke who was a member of the United States water polo team at the Los Angeles games. Candy was later remarried to Fred Merrill Jr. and they now run their own real estate firm, Merill Companies.

Awards
Costie was inducted into the International Swimming Hall of Fame in Fort Lauderdale, Florida in 1995.

See also
 List of members of the International Swimming Hall of Fame

References

External links
 

1963 births
Living people
American synchronized swimmers
Olympic gold medalists for the United States in synchronized swimming
Synchronized swimmers at the 1984 Summer Olympics
Olympic medalists in synchronized swimming
Medalists at the 1984 Summer Olympics
World Aquatics Championships medalists in synchronised swimming
Pan American Games gold medalists for the United States
Pan American Games medalists in synchronized swimming
Synchronized swimmers at the 1983 Pan American Games
Swimming commentators
Medalists at the 1983 Pan American Games